Ring 4 may refer to:

Places
 Ring 4 (ring of Uranus)
 Ring 4 Route, a super bikeways in metropolitan Copenhagen, Denmark
 Ring 4, one of the motorways in Denmark

Other uses
 Ring 4 (computer security), see protection ring

See also

 The Ring Volume 0: Birthday, the fourth release volume in the Ring literary J-horror series
 S (Suzuki novel), the fourth novel in the Ring literary J-horror series
 Sadako 3D 1, the fourth film in the Ring cinematic J-horror series
 Sadako 3D 2, the in-universe chronological fourth sequel to Ring in the cinematic J-horror series
 Fourth planned The Ring film in the U.S. film series of The Ring (franchise)
 Fourth Ring Society, at the New York City Ballet
 Fourth Ring Road (disambiguation)
 Ring (disambiguation)